Lieto is a a city and municipality of Finland.

It is located in the province of Western Finland and is part of the Southwest Finland region.

Neighbour municipalities are Aura, Kaarina, Marttila, Paimio, Pöytyä and Turku.

The city is unilingually Finnish.

Lieto has a medieval stone church, St. Peter's church, that originates from around 1500 near the city center.

The city is also home to the largest local scout troop in Finland, called LEK or Liedon Eränkävijät.

Lieto was changed to a city in July 2022.

References

External links

Municipality of Lieto – Official website
Danish Media Company - Lieto – Website
St. Peter's Church in Lieto 

 
Populated places established in the 1330s